The Left Alliance (AI) was a Spanish electoral coalition created ahead of the 1918 general election.

References

Defunct political parties in Spain
Political parties established in 1918
Political parties disestablished in 1918
1918 establishments in Spain
1918 disestablishments in Spain
Restoration (Spain)